Tatarsky Meneuz (Tatar Mönäweze) is a rural locality (a village) in Bazitamaksky Selsoviet, Ilishevsky District, Bashkortostan, Russia. The population was 156 as of 2010. There are 3 streets.

Geography 
Tatarsky Meneuz is located 37 km northeast of Verkhneyarkeyevo (the district's administrative centre) by road. Tashkichi is the nearest rural locality.

References 

Rural localities in Ilishevsky District